Olizon was an ancient Greek town and polis (city-state) of Magnesia located in the region of Thessaly. Olizon is mentioned by Homer, who gives it the epithet of "rugged"; and in the Catalogue of Ships in the Iliad, Olizon formed part of the territories of Philoctetes. 

It is also mentioned in the Periplus of Pseudo-Scylax as a city in Magnesia, together with Iolcus, Spalauthra, Methone and Coracae. In Strabo's time, it formed part of the dependent territories of Demetrias on a section of the coast where Thaumacia and Meliboea also stood. Plutarch wrote that it was located opposite Artemisium in Euboea.

Olizon is located at the Palaiokastro (old fort) at Agios Andreas.

References

Sources

Ancient Magnesia
Populated places in ancient Thessaly
Locations in the Iliad
Cities in ancient Greece
Thessalian city-states
Former populated places in Greece